Ravenel is a town in Charleston County, South Carolina, United States. The population was 2,465 at the 2010 census. Ravenel is part of the Charleston-North Charleston-Summerville metropolitan area.

Geography
Ravenel is located in western Charleston County at  (32.777930, -80.221112). It is bordered to the south by the town of Hollywood.

Demographics

2020 census

As of the 2020 United States census, there were 2,542 people, 986 households, and 662 families residing in the town.

2000 census
As of the census of 2000, there were 2,214 people, 799 households, and 581 families residing in the town. The population density was 179.5 people per square mile (69.3/km2). There were 863 housing units at an average density of 70.0 per square mile (27.0/km2). The racial makeup of the town was 47.88% White, 49.95% African American, 0.05% Native American, 0.41% Asian, 1.13% from other races, and 0.59% from two or more races. Hispanic or Latino of any race were 2.66% of the population.

There were 799 households, out of which 36.2% had children under the age of 18 living with them, 49.3% were married couples living together, 19.1% had a female householder with no husband present, and 27.2% were non-families. 21.0% of all households were made up of individuals, and 7.3% had someone living alone who was 65 years of age or older. The average household size was 2.76 and the average family size was 3.25.

In the town, the population was spread out, with 30.4% under the age of 18, 7.4% from 18 to 24, 28.5% from 25 to 44, 24.4% from 45 to 64, and 9.3% who were 65 years of age or older. The median age was 35 years. For every 100 females, there were 92.4 males. For every 100 females age 18 and over, there were 87.7 males.

The median income for a household in the town was $33,021, and the median income for a family was $36,477. Males had a median income of $33,009 versus $21,306 for females. The per capita income for the town was $15,495. About 15.9% of families and 18.3% of the population were below the poverty line, including 25.8% of those under age 18 and 11.9% of those age 65 or over.

Government 
The city is run by an elected mayor–council government system.

Mayor
Stephen W. Tumbleston

Council members
Robert L. Cochran, Terry Wilkinson, A. Gail Farrior, Jr., James R. Rodgers Jr., Harold T. "Buck" Dukes, Jr., Buckey Waters

References

External links

Town of Ravenel official website

Towns in Charleston County, South Carolina
Towns in South Carolina
Charleston–North Charleston–Summerville metropolitan area